The 2019 Santaizi ATP Challenger was a professional tennis tournament played on indoor hard courts. It was the sixth edition of the tournament which was part of the 2019 ATP Challenger Tour. It took place in Taipei, Taiwan between 8 and 14 April.

Singles main-draw entrants

Seeds

 1 Rankings are as of 1 April 2019.

Other entrants
The following players received wildcards into the singles main draw:
  Ray Ho
  Hsu Yu-hsiou
  Lee Kuan-yi
  Lo Chien-hsun
  Yu Cheng-yu

The following player received entry into the singles main draw using a protected ranking:
  Illya Marchenko

The following players received entry from the qualifying draw:
  Sriram Balaji
  Hsieh Cheng-peng

The following player received entry as a lucky loser:
  Brydan Klein

Champions

Singles

 Dennis Novak def.  Sergiy Stakhovsky 6–2, 6–4.

Doubles

 Sriram Balaji /  Jonathan Erlich def.  Sander Arends /  Tristan-Samuel Weissborn 6–3, 6–2.

References

2019 ATP Challenger Tour
2019
2019 in Taiwanese tennis
April 2019 sports events in Asia